David Chubinashvili (September 26, 1814 – June 5, 1891), otherwise known as David Yesseevich Chubinov (or Tchoubinoff) by the Russified form of his name was a Georgian lexicographer, linguist and scholar of old Georgian literature.

Career 
Having graduated from the University of St. Petersburg in 1839, he later lectured there on Georgian language, rising to the rank of professor. He helped establish the Department of Georgian Language and Literature and chaired it from 1855 to 1871. He was elected to the Imperial Geographic and Imperial Archaeological Societies and participated in the Tbilisi-based Society for the Spreading of Literacy Among Georgians (SSLG).

He wrote literary criticism for the Russian and Georgian press, authored several works on Georgian language and literature, and published Shota Rustaveli and other classics of old Georgian literature. Chubinov was twice awarded Demidov Prize for compiling Georgian-Russian-French and Russian-Georgian dictionaries in 1840 and 1846 respectively. He bequeathed his rich collection of Georgian manuscripts to the SSLG.

Personal life 
Chubinov was born on September 26, 1814. He died on June 5, 1891, at the age of 76.

See also 

 List of lexicographers

References 

 Давид Йессеевич Чубинов, Brockhaus and Efron Encyclopedic Dictionary.

1814 births
1891 deaths
Linguists from Georgia (country)
Lexicographers from Georgia (country)
Saint Petersburg State University alumni
Demidov Prize laureates
Kartvelian studies scholars
19th-century lexicographers